Now That's What I Call Music! 33 or Now 33 may refer at least two Now That's What I Call Music! series albums, including

Now That's What I Call Music! 33 (UK series)
Now That's What I Call Music! 33 (U.S. series)